Euan Lloyd (6 December 1923 – 2 July 2016) was a British film producer.

Biography

He began his career directing short travelogue documentaries, starting with April in Portugal in 1954 (not released until 1956). He worked in publicity, giving away Anita Ekberg at her wedding to Anthony Steel.

Lloyd befriended Alan Ladd while making The Red Beret (1953) and Ladd gained Lloyd a job on production for Warwick Productions. He worked for that company for several years, then went to work for Carl Foreman.

Lloyd's first credit as producer came when Richard Widmark, with whom he had made A Prize of Gold (1955), asked him to co produce The Secret Ways (1961). He went on to produce The Poppy Is Also a Flower (1966), Murderer's Row (1966), and westerns such as Shalako (1968) Catlow (1971) and The Man Called Noon (1973). Lloyd obtained finance from international sources.

In the 1970s, Lloyd went independent, but his first effort, Paper Tiger (1975), was not a success, although he said it was probably his favourite picture.

He put everything he had behind the $10 million action film The Wild Geese (1978). He followed with The Sea Wolves, (1980) starring Roger Moore, David Niven and Gregory Peck and Who Dares Wins (1982). His last film was Wild Geese II (1985) starring Scott Glenn and Laurence Olivier.

Lloyd appeared in the short documentary The Last of the Gentleman Producers which accompanied the 2004 release of The Wild Geese on DVD, and also contributed to the audio commentary alongside Roger Moore and film editor/second unit director John Glen. He died on 2 July 2016 at the age of 92.

Personal life
Lloyd married  actress Jane Hylton (born Audrey Clark). Their daughter is Rosalind Lloyd. Lloyd's second marriage was to Patricia Donahue (born Patricia Mahar) on 17 November 1961.

Credits

The Red Beret (1953) – publicist
The Black Knight (1954) – production assistant
The Cockleshell Heroes (1955) – production assistant
Safari (1956) – production assistant
April in Portugal (documentary, 1956) – director
Zarak (1956) – production assistant
Land of Laughter (documentary, 1957) – director, writer
Fire Down Below (1957) – production assistant
Love in Monaco (documentary, 1959) aka Invitation to Monte Carlo – producer, director, writer
The Secret Ways (1961) – associate producer
The Victors (1963) – associate producer
Genghis Khan (1966) – associate producer
Murderers' Row (1966) – associate producer
The Poppy Is Also a Flower (1966) – producer
Shalako (1968) – producer
Catlow (1971) – producer
The Man Called Noon (1973) – producer
Paper Tiger (1975) – producer
The Wild Geese (1978) – producer
The Sea Wolves (1980) – producer
The Final Option (1982) – producer
Wild Geese II (1985) – producer

Unmade Films
The Tigers Roar (1961) – with Richard Widmark, a follow up to The Secret Ways
Musical with Brigitte Bardot with script by Jack Davis (1968)

References

External links
 

1923 births
2016 deaths
British film producers